Lion Capital may refer to:

Architecture 
 The Lion Capital of Ashoka, a sculpture used as the national emblem of India
 Mathura lion capital, an Indo-Scythian sandstone capital from Mathura in India

Companies 
 Lion Capital LLP, a British private equity firm formerly affiliated with Hicks Muse Tate & Furst
 Lion Capital, a former affiliate of Apollo Global Management

Other
 Lion Capital Series of banknotes were currency notes issued after Indian independence